Félix Arámbulo (7 January 1942 – 16 March 2018) was a Paraguayan footballer. He played in six matches for the Paraguay national football team from 1962 to 1963. He was also part of Paraguay's squad for the 1963 South American Championship.

References

External links
 

1942 births
2018 deaths
Paraguayan footballers
Paraguay international footballers
Place of birth missing
Association football forwards
Club Olimpia footballers
Club Atlético Independiente footballers
Club Guaraní players
Unión Magdalena footballers
Club Libertad footballers
Paraguayan expatriate footballers
Expatriate footballers in Argentina
Expatriate footballers in Colombia